Joe or Joseph Gordon may refer to:

Joe Gordon (1915–1978), American baseball player
Joe Gordon (cricketer), English cricketer
Joe Gordon (musician) (1928–1963), American jazz trumpeter
Joseph Maria Gordon (1856–1929), Australian general
Joseph Gordon (politician), member of the 111th New York State Legislature

See also
Joseph Gordon-Levitt (born 1981), American actor